WDZY is a Conservative Religious formatted broadcast radio station licensed to Colonial Heights, Virginia, serving the Petersburg/Richmond area.  WDZY is owned and operated by Wilkins Radio Network, Inc.

History
The station went on the air as WCLA in 1955, later to become WPVA.  On November 13, 1989, the station changed its call sign to WSTK.  On March 19, 1997, it changed to WZOD.  On February 19, 1998, it changed to the current WDZY.

Sale and falling silent

In June 2013, Disney put WDZY and six other Radio Disney stations in medium markets up for sale, in order to refocus the network's broadcast distribution on top-25 markets.

On September 29, 2013, WDZY dropped the Radio Disney affiliation and went Silent. In November, Disney filed to sell WDZY to the Richmond Christian Radio Corporation, a subsidiary of Wilkins Radio Network, Inc.

The sale was "consummated" on December 31, 2013 and "accepted" by the FCC on January 10, 2014.  WDZY resumed operations on January 17, 2014.

Translator
In addition to the main station, WDZY is relayed by an FM translator to widen its broadcast area.

References

External links
 AM1290 The Word Online

1955 establishments in Virginia
Radio stations established in 1955
Former subsidiaries of The Walt Disney Company
DZY
Colonial Heights, Virginia